Bishop Alexander Choolaparambil (14 October 1877 – 8 January 1951) was born in Kumarakom, India. Ordained a priest in 1906, he was appointed Vicar Apostolic of Kottayam and then bishop of Busiris that same year. In 1923 Mar Choolaparampil became bishop of Kottayam, dying in that capacity in 1951.

External links
Alexander Choolaparampil at Catholic-Hierarchy

1877 births
1951 deaths
20th-century Eastern Catholic bishops
Archbishops of Kottayam